Nikolaos Doumpiotis (Greek: Νικόλαος Δουμπιώτης, 1866 – 1951) was a Greek soldier and revolutionary who would become known for his participation in the Macedonian Struggle. He would retire from the Hellenic Army with the rank of major general.

Biography 

He was born in Atalanti in 1866 and was descended from the Doumpiotis family (from Doumpia in Chalkidiki). His father Ioannis Doumpiotis took part with Tsamis Karatasos in the 1854 Macedonian rebellion. In 1882 he enlisted as a volunteer in the Hellenic army. He participated in the Greco-Turkish War of 1897  as a second lieutenant of the 4th Infantry Regiment. In 1907, he joined the Greek Struggle for Macedonia with the rank of captain and the nom de guerre "Kapetan Amyntas." His force would replace that of Tellos Agras. His area of responsibility included Veroia, Vodena and Naousa, where he fought against Bulgarian komitadjis. He participated in the Balkan Wars as a major. He retired in 1923 as a major general.

Personal life 
He married, in a third marriage (his first two wives had died) the daughter of the poet Georgios Souris, Myrto, with whom he had two children, Ioannis and Elisabeth. Upon the commencement of the Greco-Italian War on October 28, 1940, Ioannis enlisted as a volunteer, left for the Front and was killed in action in the first few days. His daughter Elizabeth married and gave him two grandchildren, Dimitrios and Nikolaos Giannakopoulos.

He died in Athens in 1951.

References 

Greek military personnel of the Balkan Wars
Greek military personnel of the Macedonian Struggle
People from Phthiotis
1866 births
1951 deaths
Hellenic Army generals